The final of the Men's 400 metres Hurdles event at the 2003 Pan American Games took place on Wednesday August 6, 2003, with the heats staged a day earlier. Dominican Republic's Félix Sánchez set a new Pan American Games record in the final, clocking 48.19 seconds.

Medalists

Records

Results

Notes

See also
2003 World Championships in Athletics – Men's 400 metres hurdles
Athletics at the 2004 Summer Olympics – Men's 400 metre hurdles

References
Results

Hurdles, Men's 400
2003